Miss Tanakpur Haazir Ho is a 2015 Indian Hindi political satire film directed by Vinod Kapri. Inspired by true events, the film centers on a man accused of sexually molesting a buffalo. The film stars Rahul Bagga and Annu Kapoor, with Om Puri, Ravi Kishan, Sanjay Mishra, and Hrishita Bhatt in supporting roles. It was produced by Vinay Tiwari. It was released on 26 June 2015.

Synopsis
Sualaal is the head of the village Tanakpur and a wealthy but impotent chauvinist. He married the much younger Maya. They tend to ignore each other. Arjun, however, a village youth, meets Maya and wins her heart. Arjun's father gives up his life savings to secure a job in the Police force. Sualaal suspects Maya cannot prove it. He is anguished that his wife mocked him for impotence. 

One day a crony catches Maya and Arjun together. Arjun receives severe punishment. On the day of his sister's wedding while everyone is at the wedding, Arjun sneaks into Sualaal's home to meet Maya. When Saulaal can't find Arjun at the wedding hall, he immediately returns home and severely inflict pain on him. He is, however, restrained by his servants. They tell him that if he creates a scene, people will learn about his wife's affair which would shame him. He decides to frame Arjun in a rape case of his buffalo "Miss Tanakpur". The evidence is forged. Initially, everyone dismisses this as a shame, but then Sualaal pays bribes and gets the case registered by the police. Arjun is taken into custody, bringing shame and grief to his family. His sister's wedding is cancelled. His father goes on a hunger strike and dies. The police severely beat him and when he is brought in front of a court, the judges order prosecution to present the victim, Miss Tanakpur.

On their way to the next court hearing, Miss Tanakapur has an accident and she is injured. At this moment everyone is apathetic towards her, and only Arjun is sympathetic. On the third court hearing, Miss Tanakpur is brought to the court. The judge asks the police to do verification based on identification marks mentioned in the FIR and it is found that she is not Miss Tanakpur. The judge is annoyed and chides the prosecutor. Saulaal had sold the buffalo before filing a case. With great difficulty, they locate her and bring her to the police station. Meanwhile, Sualaal is unhappy with the court developments and decides to inflict further pain on Arjun's family. He announces that as a form of penance, Arjun must marry Miss Tanakpur. Maya is unable to bear this and offers to expose her husband. Arjun refuses her, and want her to avoid his fate. Throughout the ordeal, Arjun is sympathetic towards Miss Tanakpur. On the day of the wedding, Saulaal takes Miss Tanakpur from the police for the night. During the wedding  she runs away and no one can trace her.

At subsequent court hearings, the police cannot to produce her, leading the police officer investigating the case to be suspended.  In order to exact his revenge, the police officer reveals the truth in the court and Saulaal along with his cronies are sent to jail. Arjun is acquitted.

Cast
 Annu Kapoor as Sualaal Gandass
 Hrishita Bhatt as Maya
 Om Puri as Matang Singh
 Sanjay Mishra as Pandit
 Ravi Kishan as Bheema
 Rahul Bagga as Arjun Prasad
 Brijendra Kala
 Heena Panchal as item number

Soundtrack
Palash Muchhal composed two songs and Susmit Sen composed one. The audio Was Released on T-Series.

Release
The film was released on 26 June 2015.

Production
Director Vinod Kapri explained that the film is based on a real event in Rajasthan, in which the state high court sentenced a boy to jail for allegedly raping a buffalo. Kapri set the film in Haryana instead, because he liked the Haryanvi language. The film has a mix of Hindi and Haryanvi-language dialog.

References

External links
 
 

2015 films
Indian satirical films
Indian political satire films
Films scored by Palash Muchhal
Films set in Haryana
Fox Star Studios films